Esto Es Lo Que Soy (English: This Is What I Am) is the first extended play (EP) released by Jesse & Joy. It was launched in early 2008, and it contains all of their singles from Esta Es Mi Vida, excepting for "Somos lo Que Fue". It also contains a self-titled song, which served as the theme song for the Mexican soap opera Las Tontas No Van al Cielo.

Track listing
"Esto Es lo Que Soy" – 3:32
"Espacio Sideral" – 3:43
"Ya No Quiero" – 3:27
"Volveré" - 3:50
"Llegaste Tú" - 4:06

Credits
Produced by Jesse Huerta.
Joy Huerta - Lead vocals.
Jesse Huerta - Guitars, bass and background vocals.
Tomas - Drums and tambourine.
Raal - Recorder and engineered.
Benny Faccone - Mixer

Charts

References

2008 EPs
Jesse & Joy EPs
Spanish-language EPs
Warner Music Latina EPs